The third season of the D.Gray-man anime series, called the "2nd stage", was directed by Osamu Nabeshima and produced by TMS Entertainment. It adapts Katsura Hoshino's manga. Like the rest of the series, it follows the adventures of Allen Walker, an Exorcist that wields the power of "Innocence" to fight against the Earl of Millennium, an ancient sorcerer seeking to destroy the world with monsters called akuma.

The season initially ran from October 2, 2007 to September 30, 2008, on TV Tokyo in Japan. Thirteen DVD compilations of the second season, each containing four episodes were released by Aniplex between March 5, 2008 and March 4, 2009. In June 2016, the series was licensed by Funimation for an English-language release in North America. In August 2017, Funimation announced they would release the series' second half on home media version starting on October of the same year. 

Three pieces of theme music are used for the series: one opening themes and four ending themes. The opening theme is "Doubt & Trust" by Access.



Episode list

Home media release

Japanese

English

See also

List of D.Gray-man episodes
List of D.Gray-man chapters
List of D.Gray-man characters

References
General

Specific

External links
Official website 
Official TMS Entertainment website for the anime 
Official TV Tokyo website for the anime 

2007 Japanese television seasons
2008 Japanese television seasons
Season 3